The New York Film Critics Circle Award for Best Supporting Actor is an award given by the New York Film Critics Circle, honoring the finest achievements in film-making.

Winners

1960s

1970s

1980s

1990s

2000s

2010s

2020s

Multiple awards
2 wins
 Jack Nicholson (1969, 1983)
 Joe Pesci (1980, 2019)

See also
 Academy Award for Best Supporting Actor
 National Board of Review Award for Best Supporting Actor
 National Society of Film Critics Award for Best Supporting Actor
 Los Angeles Film Critics Association Award for Best Supporting Actor

References

External links
 nyfcc.com

Film awards for supporting actor
New York Film Critics Circle Awards
Awards established in 1969